Saridkel is an ancient site  located in the khunti district of Jharkhand. There are ancient ruins of burnt brick houses found on the site along with redware pottery, copper tools, coins, gold earrings and iron tools. Well fortified buildings suggest that it was probably a royal house or Monastery belonging to the 1st or 2nd century CE, according to the archeological department.

History
British discovered the place. They found burnt brick, water tanks, pottery, Coins, Cooper and iron tools in Sarikel. They discovered urn burials with copper and gold ornaments in Khuntitola village near the site. They found ruin of stone Shiva temple, Shiva linga and stone bull in nearby village. The gold coin was of Huvishka type. Sarat Chandra Roy investigated it in 1915. He found redware potsherds, ancient bricks, copper hooks, rods, coins, iron arrow heads,  chisels, nails and ploughshares, gold ear ornament and stone beads on the site. There are several ancient sites located around the 20 villages in the region such as Khunti tola, Kunjala. The sites of Kunjala exhibited redware pottery with coarse fabric and the urn burial in Khunti tola exhibited red ware pottery with coarse fabric, copper and iron tools. S.C Roy called it Asura forts and belongs to early centuries CE. Amalananda Ghosh also visited the site in 1944 and declared it as very promising sites among all Asura sites. The Brahmi inscription also found which are from 3rd century BCE.

Excavations
Saridkel site was excavated in 2004 under A.S.I Ranchi. It revealed two occupational periods belong to the same culture. Early settlements had use of baked bricks, charcoal, iron slag and sand. It suggests iron smelting. Period II suggests building activities. Wall were found with the use of backing bricks of size 41 x 26 x 7 cm on the periphery of mounds with the alignment of the river to protect the settlement. Wheel made pottery found and characterized by coarse fabric with thick section and red colour. The Pottery was of redware, grey, black and red slipware. The ledged lid, flat-based bowl, sprinkler, and incised decorated design suggest a Kushan influence. Iron objects with large iron slags were found. Copper objects, hooks and rods, clay sealings, copper coins, terracotta, hop-scotches, terracotta human and animal figurines, beads of chalcedony, agate and carnelian and a two-legged saddle quern were found. A Sivalinga and Yoni was also discovered. The carbon dating of these materials gave date of 20 BC to 100 AD. Well fortified buildings suggest it was probably a royal house or Monastery belonging to the 1st or 2nd century CE.

Excavation at Urn burial sites Khuntitola exhibited red ware pottery with coarse fabrics, copper ornaments and beads of stone and copper. A tiny metal of man plugging with two bulls was also discovered. Excavation at Kunjala exhibited burnt bricks of 22 x 6 cm and 44 x 23 x 5.5 cm length and buildings of four rooms. The largest room was 5 x 4 x 0.15 meters and the smallest was 2.5 meters with a veranda. Red ware pottery with coarse fabrics and terracotta red in colour was found. It dates to the early centuries CE.

References

Jharkhand
History of Jharkhand